The 1979 Baylor Bears football team represented the Baylor University in the 1979 NCAA Division I-A football season.  The Bears finished the regular season fourth in the Southwest Conference. A win over Clemson in the Peach Bowl capped the season.

Schedule

Game summaries

Peach Bowl

Freshman DB Kyle Woods, who injured his neck in preseason practice, spoke to the team before the game and was on the sidelines in wheelchair as team wore No. 23 towels as tribute.

Roster

Team players drafted into the NFL
The following players were drafted into professional football following the season.

Awards and honors
Mike Singletary, (All-America) honors
Mike Singletary, Davey O'Brien Memorial Trophy, awarded to the most outstanding player in the Southwest Conference.
Mike Singletary was the only college junior to be selected to the All-Southwest Conference Team of the 1970s.

References

Baylor
Baylor Bears football seasons
Peach Bowl champion seasons
Baylor Bears football